This is a graphical lifespan timeline of presidents of the Senate of Romania.  The presidents are listed in order of office.

<div style="overflow:auto">

See also 

 Senate of Romania
 Parliament of Romania

External links
 Senate of Romania

Romanian history timelines